Kalynychenko or Kalinichenko is a Ukrainian surname. Notable people with the surname include:

 Anton Kalinitschenko (born 1982), Russian ski jumper
 Maksym Kalynychenko (born 1979), Ukrainian footballer
 Regina Kalinichenko (born 1985), Russian handball player
 Vitaliy Kalinichenko (born 1993), Ukrainian ski jumper
 Vitaliy Kalynychenko (1938–2017), Soviet-Ukrainian dissident

See also
 
 

Ukrainian-language surnames